Joe Biden (born 1942) is the 46th president of the United States since 2021.

Biden may also refer to:

People with the surname
 Biden family, for more on the family of the US president
 Joseph Biden Sr. (1915–2002), businessman and father of the president
 Valerie Biden Owens (born 1945), political strategist and sister of the president
 Neilia Hunter Biden (1942–1972), teacher and first wife of the president
 Beau Biden (1969–2015), Attorney General of Delaware, soldier, and son of the president
 Hunter Biden (born 1970), businessman and son of the president
 Kathleen Biden, writer and former wife of Hunter Biden
 Melissa Cohen Biden, activist and wife of Hunter Biden
 Naomi Biden (born 1993), lawyer and granddaughter of the president
 Jill Biden (born 1951), educator and current wife of the president
 Ashley Biden (born 1981), social worker and daughter of the president
 Christopher Biden ( 1789–1858), British officer with the East India Company
 Preston Sturges (born Edmund Preston Biden; 1898–1959), American playwright and film director

Other uses
 Bidens, a genus of flowering plant
 2012 VP, a planetoid nicknamed "Biden"
 Joe Biden (The Onion), a fictionalized caricature of Biden from the satirical newspaper The Onion
 Biden Welcome Center, a rest stop in Delaware located on Interstate 95
 Joseph R. Biden, Jr. Railroad Station, an Amtrak station in Wilmington, Delaware
 Joseph R. Biden, Jr. School of Public Policy & Administration, a division of the University of Delaware focused on public policy
 Penn Biden Center for Diplomacy and Global Engagement, a division of the University of Pennsylvania focused on foreign policy
 "Biden", a 2020 song by Bo Burnham from the 2022 album The Inside Outtakes

See also

Bidin, surname
Micael Bydén (born 1964), Supreme Commander of the Swedish Armed Forces
Bident, a two-pronged tool similar to a pitchfork
Bidan (disambiguation)
Bidon (disambiguation)
Boden (disambiguation)